Trinity with Palm Grove Church is in Alton Road, Claughton, Birkenhead, Wirral, Merseyside, England.  It is a combined United Reformed and Methodist Church. The church is recorded in the National Heritage List for England as a designated Grade II listed building.

History

Originally known as Trinity Church, it was built between 1865 and 1866, and was designed by W. and J. Hay.  Initially it was a Presbyterian church. In 1977 Trinity Presbyterian Church was united with Palm Grove Methodist Church.

Architecture

Trinity Church is constructed in rubble stone with dressings in red and yellow ashlar.  It has slated roofs.  The plan consists of a nave with a south porch, north and south aisles, north and south transepts, a hall with a north porch at the east end, and a northwest tower with a spire.  At the west end is a doorway with a trefoil head flanked by lancet windows. Over this is a five-light window with Decorated tracery.  The porch is canted, and has a doorway with lancet windows above it.  Along the sides of the aisles each gabled bay contains three lancets and a two-light Decorated window above.  On the north and south sides of the transepts are two groups of three lancets, with a four-light Decorated window above.  The hall at the east end has an apse and a large gabled north porch.  On the north side of the tower is a doorway leading to a projecting stair turret.  In the top stage of the tower are paired bell openings under gables, and on the corners are pinnacles.  There are lucarnes on the spire.

Inside the church is a gallery that curves round three sides.  This is carried on square cast iron columns, and contains raked seating.  The columns continue up to the roof, and have foliate capitals.  At the east end of the church is a central octagonal pulpit, reading desks and a lectern, all of which are flanked by choir stalls.

See also

Listed buildings in Claughton, Merseyside

Notes and references
Notes

Citations

Churches in Birkenhead
Methodist churches in Merseyside
United Reformed churches in England
Grade II listed churches in Merseyside
Gothic Revival church buildings in England
Gothic Revival architecture in Merseyside
Churches completed in 1866
1866 establishments in England